Pachyodes ornataria is a moth of the family Geometridae first described by Frederic Moore in 1888. It is found in India and in the Chinese provinces of Hubei, Hunan, Yunnan, Xizang and Sichuan.

References

Moths described in 1888
Pseudoterpnini
Moths of Asia